Soma Engineering (officially Soma spol. s r.o.) is a flexographic printing press and converting equipment manufacturer based in Lanškroun, Czech Republic. The company's key products are flexographic presses, slitter rewinders, laminators, plate mounters, sheeters and die cutters.

History 
The company was established in 1992 by Czech businessman Ladislav Verner. After 20 years, it became one of the leaders in the development and production technology of flexographic printing machines. In 2012, the company opened new centre of technology Soma Globe. The company's interest in innovation and development reached a peak in 2013, when flexographic printing machine OPTIMA was launched. One year later, OPTIMA has been honoured by iF Award, Product Design Category. The same year, 2014, during the conference Flexo Challenges, new training centre Villa Globe was opened.

References 

Companies established in 1992
Czech brands
Engineering companies of the Czech Republic
Printing press manufacturers